Amphimenes is a genus of beetles in the family Carabidae, the ground beetles. They are native to Asia from Burma to Japan to Vietnam.

These are small to medium-sized beetles. They have small to large eyes and short to long antennae. The bodies are totally or mostly hairless. Some are wingless. They are a solid color or may have light spots on the iridescent elytra. Their coloration is mostly dark but the legs are usually lighter, sometimes yellow to red in color.

These beetles live in forests. They can be found in lowlands or in mountains. Species that live in trees have wings; those that live mostly on the ground are often wingless.

Species 
Amphimenes contains the following 33 species:

 Amphimenes absensacidus Hunting & Yang, 2019
 Amphimenes acutipennis Fedorenko, 2019
 Amphimenes asahinai Nakane, 1957
 Amphimenes basipunctatus Fedorenko, 2019
 Amphimenes beichatiensis Hunting & Yang, 2019
 Amphimenes bicoloripes Fedorenko, 2019
 Amphimenes bidoupensis Fedorenko, 2010
 Amphimenes brunneus (Kirschenhofer, 1999)
 Amphimenes femoralis Fedorenko, 2019
 Amphimenes giganteus Fedorenko, 2010
 Amphimenes gracilis Fedorenko, 2010
 Amphimenes guttatus Fedorenko, 2014
 Amphimenes kabakovi Fedorenko, 2010
 Amphimenes konplongensis Fedorenko, 2019
 Amphimenes maculatus Fedorenko, 2010
 Amphimenes marginicollis Fedorenko, 2019
 Amphimenes medius Fedorenko, 2010
 Amphimenes micros Fedorenko, 2014
 Amphimenes minutus Fedorenko, 2010
 Amphimenes montanus Fedorenko, 2010
 Amphimenes nitidus Fedorenko, 2010
 Amphimenes piceolus Bates, 1873
 Amphimenes piceus Andrewes, 1931
 Amphimenes planicollis Fedorenko, 2010
 Amphimenes planipennis Fedorenko, 2014
 Amphimenes reflexicollis Fedorenko, 2010
 Amphimenes ruficollis Fedorenko, 2019
 Amphimenes rufipes Fedorenko, 2010
 Amphimenes rugulipennis (Bates, 1892)
 Amphimenes ryukyuensis Habu, 1964
 Amphimenes similis Fedorenko, 2019
 Amphimenes subcostatus Fedorenko, 2019
 Amphimenes tonkinensis Fedorenko, 2019
 Amphimenes wooshini Choi & Park, 2020

References

Lebiinae